Rajarbagh is a residential area of Dhaka, Bangladesh. There is a police line in Rajarbagh. The areas adjacent to it are Shantinagar, Motijheel, Malibagh, Shantibagh, Momenbagh, Shahidbagh, Siddheshwari and Shahjahanpur.

History 
On 25 March 1971, the Pakistan Army attacked the Rajarbagh police line with the start of Operation Searchlight.

Installations 
 Rajarbagh Police Line Hospital 
Rajarbag Police Lines School and College
Bangladesh Police Museum 
Central Police Hospital

References

Neighbourhoods in Dhaka